Souitir is a small village in the south-east of Tunisia.

Location
It is within the Medenine Governorate, approximately 20 kilometers from Medenine.

Demographics
The number of inhabitants in Souitir has increased significantly during the last decade. Although the exact number is not known, it is estimated to be around 1000 inhabitants.

Economy
The economic activity in Souitir is limited to agriculture.

Infrastructure
Souitir has a primary school, a dispensary, and a mosque.  

Populated places in Tunisia